Roy Kafri (born November 12, 1985) is an Israeli artist, comedian, and musician. 
His various projects have been well received on the web. Kafri co-created with Niv Majar the web series Nitza Ve’Lechem. He released musical projects including the web hit "Mayokero". Kafri also starred in a mini-series "Bekitzur" as part of the 10th season of the Israeli show Eretz Nehederet.

Early life
Roy Kafri was born in 1986 in moshav Nahalal, an agricultural Jewish community in northern Israel. During Kafri’s mandatory military service in the Israel Defense Forces, he served as a military photographer for its Intelligence Corps.

Career
His first viral video was shot during his service- Chole Ba'rosh (sick in the head). The video released in 2007 received over 50,000 views and was Kafri’s first internet success. 
Gal Raz, one of the founders of the Flix website saw the video and hired Kafri as a video editor. On the job Kafri met Niv Majar and the two started shooting sketches under the name "Nitza Ve’Lechem", the show gathered a cult following online and the two were called "The godfathers of Israeli web comedy" by Time Out Tel Aviv. The show had guest appearances from author Meir Shalev, comedians Assi Cohen and Tal Friedman, singer Shimi Tavori and others.

While working at Flix, Kafri also created the hit web series Hatulanovela, a cat soap opera, garnering millions of views for its 30 or so episodes.    
In 2012 Kafri collaborated with director Vania Heymann for the first time. The two created a Pepsi Max ad starring Kafri. The two went on to create a music video for "Yes I did approach Ido" a song from Kafri’s music project "Porch songs" with comedian Tal Tirangel. The two also co-directed an ad starring Israeli super model Bar Refaeli - this video also receiving well over half a million views.
In 2013, Israeli comedy show Eretz Nehederet aired a mini-series called "Bekitzur" starring Kafri, and co-created by him and Heymann. The show was an adaptation of the French Format "Bref". The mini-series is composed of thirteen 2-minute episodes.   
In 2014 Kafri released "Mayokero" a track from his online album- "Acowpella Beatbox", the track was accompanied by a video created by Vania Heymann. The track and video were mentioned in major media outlets including Rolling Stone Magazine.

Kafri has also released a few personal videos that received online attention. Among these are two videos starring his nieces, one made for his brother's wedding "They should have fun in their country" and the other "Lior’s Turn". His Honeymoon video "8 Honeymoon Moments" was also viewed over 100k times. 
Kafri lives in New York and continues to create video content and music.

Videography

Television
 2012 - Nitza Ve’lechem on Comedy Central Israel
 2013 - Bekizur
 2016 - Roy's & Noah's Kids Tape

Web
 2007-2015 - Nitza Ve’lechem
 2011 - Catonovela

Music
 2012 - Roy Kafri and Tal Tirangel - Yes I Did Approach Ido
 2014 - Roy Kafri - Mayokero
2019 - Roy Kafri and Tal Tirangel - Shirey Mirpeset (album)

Commercials
 2010 - Egged Bus Company- Interactive web game  
 2012 - Pepsi Max BeatBox
 2012 - MyCheck ft. Bar Refaeli
 2013 - Get out the vote video
 2013 - Yevvo
 2016 - Coca-Cola & Marvel Super Bowl Commercial (Interactive Version)
 2016 - Milky Mousse Commercial

References

External links 
 Roy Kafri Official website
Roy Kafri on YouTube
Nitza Ve’lechem YouTube Channel

1985 births
Living people
Israeli artists
Israeli musicians
Israeli male comedians
Jewish artists
Jewish Israeli musicians